Akarawin Sawassdee (Thai; อัครวิน สวัสดี, born September 26, 1990), simply known as New, is a Thai professional footballer who plays as a striker for Thai League 1 club Chiangrai United . He got top goal scores and best striker awards in 2011 Thai Division 2 League Central & Eastern Region with Cha Choeng Sao.

Honours

Club
Chiangrai United
Thai League 1 (1): 2019
 Thai FA Cup (3): 2017, 2018, 2020–21
 Thailand Champions Cup (2): 2018, 2020
 Thai League Cup (1): 2018

Individual
 Regional League Eastern Division
 Top Scorer (1) : 2011

References

External links
 
 Profile at Goal

1990 births
Living people
Akarawin Sawasdee
Akarawin Sawasdee
Association football forwards
Akarawin Sawasdee
Akarawin Sawasdee
Akarawin Sawasdee
Akarawin Sawasdee
Akarawin Sawasdee
Akarawin Sawasdee